USS Tipton (AK-215) was an  that was constructed for the US Navy during the closing period of World War II. She was commissioned; however, the war ended and she was declared "excess to needs." She was then transferred to the US Coast Guard in 1946.

Construction
Tipton was laid down under US Maritime Commission (MARCOM) contract, MC hull 2169, on 28 December 1944, at Sturgeon Bay, Wisconsin, by the Leathem D. Smith Shipbuilding Company; launched on 13 March 1945; sponsored by Mrs. W. F. Maister; transferred to the Navy Department on 7 September 1945; and commissioned on 9 October 1945.

Service history
Upon commissioning, the cargo ship was transferred to the custody of the US Coast Guard for maintenance and operation and was manned by a Coast Guard crew.

Inactivation 
Tipton was decommissioned and permanently transferred to the Coast Guard on 4 March 1946. She was struck from the Navy list on 20 March 1946.

US Coast Guard service
Tipton was renamed Unalga by the Coast guard. She was one of two MARCOM C1-M-AV1  freighters acquired by the Coast Guard after World War II, along with her sister , which provided service in the construction of the many LORAN stations planned for operation around the globe.

She was converted for use as a construction supply freighter at the Coast Guard Yard in Curtis Bay, Maryland. After her conversion was complete she was ordered to the Pacific Northwest.

She was stationed at Seattle, Washington and used primarily for the construction of the Alaskan LORAN stations. On 28 November 1948 she rendered assistance to the M/V Kasilof. She was decommissioned on 19 January 1950 and turned back over to MARCOM.

Merchant service
On 1 June 1950, she entered the Reserve Fleet in Olympia, Washington. Marine Power & Equipment Company, Inc. purchased her on 6 January 1971 for $32,200 to be scrapped. However, she was renamed Sea-Alaska and converted to a Fish Factory ship owned by Trident Seafoods Inc. She was scrapped in 2007.

Notes 

Citations

Bibliography 

Online resources

External links

 

Alamosa-class cargo ships
Ships built in Sturgeon Bay, Wisconsin
1945 ships
World War II auxiliary ships of the United States
Ships of the United States Coast Guard
Tipton County, Indiana
Tipton County, Tennessee